The Dongeui Turtle Fighters football program represents Dong-eui University in college football as members of the Korea American Football Association. Founded in 1982, the Turtle Fighters have won the Korea Collegiate Champions five times. The Turtle Fighters won the Tiger Bowl three times in a row in 2006, 2007, and 2008. Seong-il Baek has been the Turtle Fighters head coach since 2002 .

External links
 

American football teams established in 1982
American football in South Korea
1982 establishments in South Korea